The 2022–23 North Caledonian Football League (known for sponsorship reasons as the Macleod & MacCallum North Caledonian League) is the 114th season of the North Caledonian Football League, and the second season as part of the sixth tier of the Scottish football pyramid system.

The league winners will enter the 2023–24 Scottish Cup at the Preliminary Round stage, if they do not already qualify as an SFA member.

Teams

To North Caledonian Football League 
 Clachnacuddin Reserves
Relegated from Highland Football League
Fort William

Stadia and locations

League table

Results

Notes 
 Club with an SFA licence (as of June 2022) eligible to participate in the Highland League play-off should they win the league.

References

External links 
 

North Caledonian Football League seasons
6
Sco
Sco6